Following is the list of endangered species in Pakistan.

Mammals

Reptiles
Testudo horsfieldii

Birds
Aythya baeri
Sterna acuticauda
Threskiornis melanocephalus
Limosa limosa
Chaetornis striata
Catreus wallichii
Aegypius monachus
Pelecanus crispus
Neophron percnopterus
Numenius arquata
Falco peregrinus peregrinus
Coracias garrulus
Aythya nyroca
Ardeotis nigriceps
Clanga clanga
Chlamydotis undulata
Rynchops albicollis
Clanga hastata
Gyps indicus
Ficedula subrubra
Falco jugger
Phoeniconaias minor
Falco naumanni
Anser erythropus
Tetrax tetrax
Locustella major
Marmaronetta angustirostris
Anhinga melanogaster
Mycteria leucocephala
Columba eversmanni
Haliaeetus leucoryphus
Circus macrourus
Prinia burnesii
Falco cherrug
Grus antigone
Grus leucogeranus
Vanellus gregarius
Phylloscopus tytleri
Tragopan melanocephalus
Oxyura leucocephala
Gyps bengalensis
Indicator xanthonotus

Fishes
 Aetomylaeus nichofii
 Thunnus obesus

Marine animals

Corals
Acropora: Acropora formosa, Acropora pharaonis, Acropora hyacinthus, Acropora horrida, Acropora granulosa
Birdsnest coral: Seriatopora caliendrum
Blue coral: Heliopora coerulea
Closed brain coral: Leptoria phrygia
Crisp pillow coral: Anomastraea irregularis
 Erythrastrea flabellata
 Pseudosiderastrea tayami
 Fungia curvata
 Goniastrea peresi, Goniopora stokesi, Goniopora lobata, Goniopora columna
 Hydnophora microconos, Hydnophora exesa
 Montastrea annuligera
 Montipora venosa, Montipora stilosa, Montipora foliosa
 Favites flexuosa, Favites flexuosa, Favites chinensis, Favites micropentagona, Favites halicora
 Galaxea astreata
 Tubipora musica
 Parasimplastrea sheppardi
 Pavona venosa, Pavona diffluens, Pavona decussata, Pavona cactus
 Physogyra lichtensteini
 Platygyra: Platygyra lamellina
 Porites: Porites harrisoni, Porites echinulata
 Psammocora contigua
 Acanthastrea: Acanthastrea hillae
 Turbinaria: Turbinaria reniformis, Turbinaria peltata

See also
List of mammals of Pakistan
List of birds of Pakistan

References

External links
Pakistan Environmental Journalists visual database of endangered species in Pakistan (archived at the Internet Archive). 

E
Pakistan
Pakistan
.E
.
E